Edward M. Cole (October 26, 1844 – April 13, 1915) was a newspaper editor and politician from New York.

Life 
Cole was born on October 26, 1844 in Conesville, New York. His parents were Ahaz N. Cole and Caroline M. Pierce. He moved to Roxbury with his family in 1854. In 1857, they moved to Windham, where they had a farm two and a half miles north known as the Cole Homestead. After he finished school, he spent a few years teaching in the district schools.

In 1862, Cole started working for the Bloomville Mirror in Bloomville, where he learned the printing trade under editor Simon B. Champion. In 1867, he moved to Windham and became co-owner of the newspaper The Windham Journal. In 1868, he turned his attention away from the Journal towards other business. In 1872, he again became co-owner of the Journal. In 1878, he became the sole proprietor of the paper. Other than a nine month period in 1882, he remained the sole owner and editor of the paper for the rest of his life.

In 1875, Cole helped organize the Catskill, Cairo, and Windham Telegraph Company. The company later fell to the control of Western Union Telegraph Company, but it still provided local and general telegraph service in Greene County. He was elected town supervisor of Windham in 1884 and served as justice of the peace for several years.

In 1891, Cole was elected to the New York State Assembly as a Democrat, representing Greene County. He served in the Assembly in 1892. He then served as postmaster of Windham from 1893 to 1897. He also served on the Windham town board and board of education.

In 1874, Cole married Josephine M. Keeler of Bloomville, daughter of assemblyman Stephen H. Keeler. They had two children, Keeler M. and Bessie Louise.

Cole died at home from an embolism on April 13, 1915. He was buried in Windham Cemetery.

References

External links 

 The Political Graveyard

1844 births
1915 deaths
People from Schoharie County, New York
People from Roxbury, New York
People from Greene County, New York
19th-century American newspaper editors
20th-century American newspaper editors
Editors of New York (state) newspapers
19th-century American newspaper publishers (people)
20th-century American newspaper publishers (people)
People from Delaware County, New York
Town supervisors in New York (state)
American justices of the peace
Democratic Party members of the New York State Assembly
19th-century American politicians
School board members in New York (state)
New York (state) postmasters
Burials in New York (state)
Deaths from embolism
19th-century American judges